Zeraei railway station (Persian:ايستگاه راه آهن زراعی, Istgah-e Rah Ahan-e Zera'i) is located in Khaseban, East Azerbaijan Province. The station is owned by IRI Railway. The station serves primarily the village of Khaseban, the neighbouring village of Sarin Dizaj, and Iran Khodro Tabriz Production Plant.

References

External links

Railway stations in Iran